Hawkshead is a village and civil parish in Cumbria, England, which attracts tourists to the South Lakeland area. Within the boundaries of the historic county of Lancashire, the parish includes the hamlets of Hawkshead Hill,  to the north west, and Outgate, a similar distance north. Hawkshead contains one primary school but no secondary school and four public houses.

Geography

Hawkshead is just north of Esthwaite Water, in a valley to the west of Windermere and east of Coniston Water. It is part of Furness, making it a part of the ancient county of Lancashire.

History
The township of Hawkshead was originally owned by the monks of Furness Abbey; nearby Colthouse derives its name from the stables owned by the Abbey. Hawkshead grew to be an important wool market in medieval times and later as a market town after the Dissolution of the Monasteries in 1532.  It was granted its first market charter by King James I in 1608. In 1585, Hawkshead Grammar School was established by Archbishop Edwin Sandys of York after he successfully petitioned Queen Elizabeth I for a charter to establish a governing body.

In the 18th and 19th centuries, Hawkshead became a village of local importance. Hawkshead Market Hall was completed in 1790.

William Wordsworth (afterwards poet laureate) was educated at Hawkshead Grammar School, whilst Beatrix Potter lived nearby as did William Heelis, a local solicitor, in the early 20th century.

With the formation of the Lake District National Park in 1951, tourism grew in importance, though traditional farming still goes on around the village. Hawkshead has a timeless atmosphere and consists of a characterful warren of alleys, overhanging gables and a series of mediaeval squares. It is eloquently described in William Wordsworth's poem The Prelude.

Much of the land in and around the village is now owned by the National Trust. The National Trust property is called Hawkshead and Claife.

Governance
The electoral ward of the same name stretches south to Colton with a total population of 1,704.

Parliamentary representation
Hawkshead is part of the Westmorland and Lonsdale parliamentary constituency and is represented in parliament by Tim Farron MP.

See also

Listed buildings in Hawkshead

References

External links

 Cumbria County History Trust: Hawkshead and Monk Coniston with Skelwith (nb: provisional research only – see Talk page)
Official Hawkshead website
Beatrix Potter Gallery and Hawkshead information at the National Trust
Hawkshead in an Illustrated guide to the Lake District
Hawkshead Grammar School Museum
Photographs of Hawkshead
The Benefice of Hawkshead with Low Wray and Sawrey and Rusland and Satterthwaite

 
Villages in Cumbria
Civil parishes in Cumbria
South Lakeland District
Furness